Bare Cove Park is a 484 acre park designated for wildlife and public recreation. It is located in Hingham, Massachusetts, on the Weymouth Back River across from Great Esker Park.

History 

Until 1906, the land now established as Bare Cove Park was privately owned. The U.S. Navy then established the Hingham Naval Ammunition Depot, also known as Hockley Hollow at the time, because of its close proximity to Boston Harbor. The depot stored munitions for aircraft and ships until it was decommissioned in 1961, and the land was given to the towns of Hingham and Weymouth in the early seventies. Hingham's portion of the land was transformed into Bare Cove Park and opened its gates to the public in 1974. The town of Weymouth created Great Esker Park with their land.

Park features 
Bare Cove Park Features multiple paved paths and trails that are often used for walking, jogging, and biking. The park consists of acres of woods, marshes, wetlands, fields, and river shoreline and is also scattered with retired naval bunkers. Many of the bunkers which have been demolished since the depot was decommissioned, leaving wide and open fields in their place.

Dog walking 
Bare Cove Park is very popular for dog walkers. Dogs must be leashed unless the dog owner has an Off-Leash Dog Walking Permit for the park. There is signage around the park designating where dogs may be off-leash.

Wildlife 
The park provides a sanctuary for diverse wildlife including minks, foxes, raccoons, and rabbits. Birds, including ospreys, double-crested cormorants, snowy egrets, and great blue herons, are seen significantly more by park-goers.

Image gallery

References

External links 

Bare Cove Park Town of Hingham

Nature reserves in Massachusetts
1974 establishments in Massachusetts
Hingham, Massachusetts